C'mon Midffîld! is one of the most successful Welsh television comedy series ever broadcast on S4C. Created by Mei Jones and Alun Ffred Jones, the show started life on BBC Radio Cymru in 1982 followed by three series before being adapted for the screen by Ffilmiau'r Nant in 1988.

The show won a BAFTA Cymru for Best Drama Series in 1992, and despite coming to an end in 1994 is still repeated regularly on S4C.

Cast
Arthur Rowland Picton — John Pierce Jones
Walter "Wali" Tomos — Mei Jones
Tecwyn "Tecs" Parri — Bryn Fôn
George Winston Huws — Llion Williams
Sandra Elizabeth Huws (née Picton) — Siân Wheldon (Series 1–4 & Special 1) / Gwenno Hodgkins (Series 5 & Special 2)
Jean Parri — Bethan Gwilym
Lydia Tomos — Catrin Dafydd
Osborne Picton — Stewart Jones (Special 1)
Elen Margaret Picton (née Griffiths) — Elliw Haf (Series 5)
Dafydd Huws — Dafydd Hughes (Series 5) / Gruff Pritchard (Special 2)
Gwenllian Angharad Huws — Gwawr Hughes (Series 5) / Lowri Price (Special 2)

Plot
The show mainly revolves around the misadventures of Bryn Coch United, a fictional village football team, which is based on Bont Football Club, a club based in the village of Pontrhydfendigaid (of which Alun Ffred Jones was a player). The running of the team is handled by a mix of uncapable committee members; quick-to-anger manager Arthur Picton, the slightly dim-witted linesman Wali Tomos, and Tecwyn Parri (the team's goalie and captain), arguably the most normal on the committee. Part of the cast outside of the football committee is Mr Picton's daughter, Sandra, and her boyfriend (later husband) and member of the football team, George Huws - a leather-clad punk rocker from Caernarfon.

Most plots were derived from the team's attempts to win their weekly games, as well as other events held in the village, and the main characters' relationships with their families. The many long-running jokes included Wali's intolerance of his mother, Lydia, Tecwyn's constantly angry wife Jean, and the fact that Arthur's (first) wife, Elsi, was almost never seen on screen - with many excuses being made for her absence. One ongoing sub-plot was Arthur Picton's dislike of his daughter's relationship with George Huws. However, Sandra was the only one who could put both her father and George in their place whenever she was unwittingly caught up in their feuds and ambitions.

Later series focuses more on expanding the families of established characters, such as introducing Arthur's brother into the show, the birth of Sandra and George's twins, the death of Arthur's wife, Elsi (after appearing on screen for only one episode), and eventually seeing him re-marry in series 5.

Team Members
Bryn Fôn — Tecwyn Parri (captain)
Llion Williams — George Huws
Alan Williams — John Bocsar
Rhys Richards — Harri Pritchard
Mal Lloyd — Graham
Dewi Rhys — Bryan Mawr (occasional)
John Hammond - Bryn Bwr Dwr (silent role)
Geraint Eifion — (silent role)
David Owen — (silent role)
Huw Charles — (silent role)
Gerald Craig — (silent role)
Geraint Williams — (silent role)
Mel Fôn — (silent role)

C'mon Midffîld vs Pobol y Cwm

Charity football match against Wales' only soap opera (at the time), Pobol y Cwm. The match was played on the week of the Urdd National Eisteddfod in Nantlle Valley, 1990.

Episodes

Radio

Television

Reunion movie
Following a trend set by the BBC when they resurrected Only Fools and Horses, C'mon Midffîld! returned to the screens after a 10-year absence on Christmas Day, 2004, with a feature-length special - Midffîld a Rasbrijam.

Plot
After a car accident, Sandra is in hospital, and the Bryncoch crew are working hard to fulfill Sandra's dream of helping and giving presents to an orphanage in Azerbaijan.  But the trip is full of turmoil, with Tecs trying to keep the peace between Arthur and George.

S4C original programming
1980s Welsh television series
1990s Welsh television series
1988 British television series debuts
1994 British television series endings
English-language television shows
1980s British comedy television series
1990s British comedy television series